Robert Salarnier (20 July 1890 – 10 April 1967) was a French field hockey player. He competed in the men's tournament at the 1928 Summer Olympics.

References

External links
 

1890 births
1967 deaths
French male field hockey players
Olympic field hockey players of France
Field hockey players at the 1928 Summer Olympics
People from Saint-Mandé